Baguiati is a locality in Bidhannagar Municipal Corporation of North 24 Parganas district in the Indian state of West Bengal. It is a part of the area covered by Kolkata Metropolitan Development Authority (KMDA).

Infrastructure

A good number of small enterprises exist in this region. These enterprises primarily deal with the import and export of small articles of jute, electronics, watch manufacturing, polyware manufacturing, medical equipment supplies etc. The township is provided with a number of educational institutes, hotels and health care institutes. Baguiati Bazar and Baguiati VIP Super Market have been known to be a prominent location for buying things.

There are 2 Post offices covering this area, one on the western half of VIP road (Deshbandhunagar), the other one on the eastern half of VIP Road (Aswininagar) which has been newly established. It also has a dedicated police station under the jurisdiction of the Bidhannagar City Police.

The region forms one of the many residential places in the city. The population level has been constantly increasing, as has been observed in the rest of the city. This area is highly congested now. The flyover from Dum Dum Park to Raghunathpur above VIP Road, which was opened in March 2015, help to keep the traffic congestion away from Baguiati. Subways have been constructed at Kestopur, Baguiati and Joramandir to prevent accidents due to road crossing and they are fully functional now.

There is also an area named Jagatpur a ghetto area connecting Baguiati and Kestopur internally is the called the crime zone of Baguiati. There have been numerous incident of unethical activities in last few decades.

Retail stores 

Baguiati is the first location in Kolkata and West Bengal to witness the opening of Big Bazaar, one of the leading retail chains of India. It is located at Parvati Vihar, Raghunathpur and is one of the oldest departmental store of its kind in Kolkata. After this, many departmental stores of similar kind, like Bazaar Kolkata, Vishal Mega Mart, Metro Bazaar have opened up, making the area a well known shopping destination for many residents of the nearby areas.

Puja Pandals
There are some famous clubs which attract people from the nearby areas during the Durga Puja and Kali Puja time. These include:
 Swamiji Pally Adhibashibrindo Kali Puja Committee (Jyangra)
 Baguiati Arjunpur Amra Sabai Club
 Railpukur United Club
 Shastribagan Sporting Club
 Nirbhik Sangha (Jora Mandir)
 Baguipara Sarbojonin Durgotsob
 Bondhu Mahal (Jarda Bagan)
 Udayan Sangha 
 Balak Sangha 
 Sports Council Club
 Dum Dum Natun Dal

References 

Cities and towns in North 24 Parganas district
Neighbourhoods in North 24 Parganas district
Neighbourhoods in Kolkata
Kolkata Metropolitan Area